Aubrey Jean Aitkenhead 'Aub' Kelly (1904–1974) was an Australian rugby league player who played in the 1920s.

Born in Neutral Bay, New South Wales in 1904, Aub 'Jockey' Kelly went on to play five seasons with St George between 1924 and 1929. A forward, he also represented New South Wales, playing 9 games between 1926 and 1927. He retired from Sydney to captain-coach Young in 1930–1931, before marrying a Queensland woman in 1932 and moving to Blackall, Queensland.

Kelly died on 17 September 1974, in Queensland aged 70.

References

St. George Dragons players
Australian rugby league coaches
Australian rugby league players
1904 births
1974 deaths
New South Wales rugby league team players
Rugby league locks
Rugby league players from Sydney